= WT20 =

WT20 can refer to:

- Women's T20 cricket, such as WT20I's.
- Twenty20 Cricket World Cup, formerly known as World Twenty20
